Stephensia major is a moth of the family Elachistidae. It was described by William D. Kearfott in 1907. It is found in North America.

References

Moths described in 1907
Elachistidae
Moths of North America